Shamal is the sixth studio album released under the name Gong and was released by Virgin Records on 13 February 1976 The album, produced by Pink Floyd drummer Nick Mason was recorded in December 1975. The album was recorded by a unique line-up referred to later as "Shamal-Gong". It is usually regarded as a transitional album between Daevid Allen's incarnation of the band and the Pierre Moerlen-led fusion line-up of the late 1970s.

Reception
Reviewing the album for the website Sputnikmusic, Robert Davis said:
The greatest thing about Shamal is that it's so versatile. There are only six tracks here, but each one seems to explore a different tone and aspect of musical experimentation. The softer tracks such as opener "Wingful of Eyes" and beautiful, elegant flute-led "Bambooji" are complementary to the album's quirkier tracks, such as the almost Frank Zappa-inspired "Cat in Clark's Shoes" and eccentric closing title track. Yet what really glues all these songs together is the absence of self-indulgent musicianship and a definite knowledge of perfect instrumental placements.

Track listing 

In 2018, a 2-CD remastered edition of the album was issued by UMC containing one CD of live material recorded in 1975, and unreleased bonus tracks to the regular album.

Personnel

Personnel
Gong
 Mike Howlett – bass guitar, vocals
 Didier Malherbe – tenor sax, soprano sax, flute, bansuri, gongs
 Mireille Bauer – marimba, glockenspiel, xylophone, percussion, gongs
 Pierre Moerlen – drums, vibraphone, tubular bells
 Patrice Lemoine – organ, piano, synthesizer
Former Gong
 Steve Hillage – acoustic guitar, electric guitar  ("Bambooji" and "Wingful of Eyes")
 Miquette Giraudy – vocals ("Bambooji")
Guest musicians 
 Jorge Pinchevsky – violin ("Chandra", "Bambooji", "Cat In Clark's Shoes", "Shamal"), voice ("Cat In Clark's Shoes")
 Sandy Colley – vocals ("Shamal")

Production
 Nick Mason: producer
 Clive Arrowsmith: artwork, photography
 Phil Ault: engineer
 Dave Hutchins: engineer
 Ben Tavera King: engineer
 Rick Curtain: engineer
 Ben King: engineer

References

External links

1975 albums
Gong (band) albums
Albums produced by Nick Mason
Pierre Moerlen's Gong albums
Progressive rock albums by British artists